Andrews Matriculation Higher Secondary School is a co-educational school situated at Vickramasingapuram in the south Indian state of Tamil Nadu.

History 
The School was founded in 1983 by the Correspondent D.Gnanaselvam MSc (Chemistry and Yoga) BEd along with his wife Mrs. Daisy Gnanaselvam MA MPhil[English]BEd. The school started in Three Lamp Campus and then moved to Kottaram campus in 1990.
Today, AMHSS has over 1200 students on roll. Its academic performance is the envy of all with annual results of almost 100 percent of the students passing in first class in Tenth Matriculation Board Exam. The school achieved District First in Tamil Nadu Common Matriculation Exam 2009.

Branches 
 Andrews Nursery and Primary School, Three Lamp, Vickramasingapuram
 Andrews Matriculation Higher Secondary School, East Kottaram, Vickramasingapuram

Achievements 

 2018 - Received the Appreciation award from the Caring Souls Foundation
 2018 - Won the Best Participation Prize for VI to VIII Girls Kabbadi Team at Gobichettipalayam, Erode
 Cent percent result in 2001,2004,2005,2008,2009,2010 Tamil Nadu Common Matriculation Exam
 2018 - Won the Best School Award from the Tamil Nadu Nursery, Primary, Matriculation, Higher Secondary and CBSE Schools Association, 2017-2018
 2018 - Won the First Prize in District Level Skating Championship conducted by the National Bharat Sevak Samaj
 2014 - Won the Best Performance award for English proficiency award from the Bharath Institute of English
 2012 - Won the Best Teaching Service award from the  Lions Club International
 2011 - Won Prize in District Level Green Corps Club Quiz Competition, Tirunelveli
 2010 - Won State Second in Karate Meet 2010
 2009 - District First in 2009 Tamil Nadu Common Matriculation Exam - Maria Priyanka
 2009 - Won the " Sirantha Kalvi Kalanjiam award" from the Tamil Nadu Cinema Kalai Mandram
 2009 - Won the " Sirantha Kalvi Chudar matrum kalvi sevai award" from the Tamil Nadu Cinema Kalai Mandram
 2009 - Won the Best Performance award at the District level Yoga Competition, conducted by the Bhaghavan Sri Ramanalaya Aanmeega Elaignar Kazhagam
 2007 - Won Trophy in District Meet in Karate
 2006 - Young Scientist Award
 2003 - Educational District Second in 2003 Tamil Nadu Common Matriculation Exam - Nancy Angeline

External links 
 School website
 School Fee details on tn.gov.in

References

School Fee details on tn.gov.in
School in Wikimapia
School in Google Map

Primary schools in Tamil Nadu
High schools and secondary schools in Tamil Nadu
Education in Tirunelveli district
Educational institutions established in 1983
1983 establishments in Tamil Nadu